Diana Anderson  is a British biomedical scientist who is a professor at the University of Bradford. Her research has focussed on early cancer detection and genome stability. She was appointed an Order of the British Empire in 2022 for her services to cancer detection.

Early life and education 
Anderson was an undergraduate student at the University of Wales, where she specialised in biology. She moved to the University of Manchester for graduate studies and completed a master's degree in 1971. She remained at Manchester for doctoral research, and in 1973 completed her PhD in oncology.

Research and career 
In 1974, Anderson was appointed Head of Mutagenesis Studies at the Imperial Chemical Industries Central Toxicology Laboratory. She worked with the laboratory to identify the relationship between cancer in employees and the plastic with which they were working. Whilst she did not establish a significant dependence, she did show that there were damaged chromosomes in cancer patients, which informed the future of her research. In 1981, she started working with British Industrial Biological Research Association, where she began to explore cancer in migraine sufferers and women who use health clubs. She developed the "comet assay", which allows for detection of DNA damage with extraordinary sensitivity. Healthy chromosomes do not present Comet-like tails.

Anderson joined the University of Bradford as Chair of Biomedical Research and continued to work on comet assays. She showed that comets were present in the chromosomes of people with colon and lung cancer. She worked with Mojgan Najafzadeh on the development of the comet assay test. She worked with IMSTAR to develop an accurate test for clinical trials. Ultimately, this test may offer a universal test for cancer.

Anderson has worked on genome stability in the umbilical cord blood. She showed that the damaged DNA of smoking fathers can pass to children, and advised fathers to stop smoking for 3 months prior to conception.

Anderson was appointed Member of the Order of the British Empire (MBE) in the 2022 New Year Honours for services to genetics and reproductive toxicology.

Awards and honours 
 2011 Yorkshire Forward Enterprise Fellow 
 2015 University of Bradford Vice Chancellor's Award for Outstanding Achievement
 2018 The English Women's Awards 
 2022 Member of the British Empire (MBE)

Selected publications

References 

British oncologists
Women oncologists
Academics of the University of Bradford
Alumni of the University of Manchester
Alumni of the University of Wales
Members of the Order of the British Empire
Living people
Year of birth missing (living people)